United States gubernatorial elections were held in 1806, in 10 states, concurrent with the House and Senate elections.

Five governors were elected by popular vote and five were elected by state legislatures.

Results

See also 
1806 United States elections

References

Notes

Bibliography